USS Allioth (AK-109/IX-204/AVS-4) was a  commissioned by the US Navy for service in World War II, named after Alioth, a star in constellation Ursa Major. She was responsible for delivering troops, goods and equipment to locations in the war zone.

Construction
SS James Rowan was laid down under a Maritime Commission (MARCOM) contract, MCE hull 1730, on 30 July 1943, by the Permanente Metals Corporation, Yard No. 2, Richmond, California; launched on 20 August 1943; sponsored by Miss Cora Clonts; acquired by the Navy on 3 October 1943; renamed Allioth and designated AK-109 on 6 October 1943; and commissioned at Portland, Oregon, on 25 October 1943.

Service history 
Upon her arrival at Pearl Harbor on 5 December 1943, the cargo ship was assigned to Service Squadron 8. During the next 11 months, she operated as a mobile supply source for the US Army. Her duties consisted of loading cargo and dispensing it to troops as needed. Among the ports from which she operated were Funafuti, Ellice Islands; Makin and Tarawa, Gilbert Islands; Kwajalein and Eniwetok, Marshall Islands; and Peleliu and Angaur, Palau Islands.

Under attack by Japanese aircraft 
Allioth sailed from Peleliu on 14 November 1944, bound for Pearl Harbor. On the afternoon of the 20th, two Japanese airplanes attacked her, dropping several bombs but scoring no hits.
 
Later that evening, one aircraft returned and dropped a bomb which exploded near the ship. Ten crewmen were slightly wounded, and the ship suffered minor structural damage from shrapnel. She continued her journey and arrived safely in Hawaiian waters on 11 December 1944.

Conversion to aviation supply issue ship 
Two days later, the ship resumed her voyage toward the US West Coast of the United States, and she entered a shipyard at Alameda, California, on 24 December, for overhaul and conversion to an Aviation Supply Issue Ship. The alterations were completed in early March 1945, and Allioth received the new designation IX-204.

Servicing aircraft at Ulithi 
On 10 March, the vessel got underway for Pearl Harbor. After taking on more cargo there, she resumed her westward voyage, dropped anchor at Ulithi on 8 April, and began supplying various units with airplane parts. On 3 May, her designation was changed to AVS-4.

Supporting aircraft in the Philippines 
When the fleet moved from Ulithi, Allioth headed for the Philippine Islands, arriving at Leyte Gulf on 27 May. In early June, the ship sailed to Seeadler Harbor, Manus Island, to load more spare parts. She returned to Leyte on 29 June, and resumed her supply duties.

Supporting aircraft in the Ryukyu Islands 
Allioth moved to Okinawa in mid-September 1945, and remained there into the next year, supporting various airplane squadrons operating in the Ryukyu Islands. On 18 January 1946, the ship got underway to return to the United States. Allioth arrived back at Alameda, California, on 16 February, and began discharging cargo. Her crew also began stripping the ship of excess equipment in preparation for her deactivation.

Post-war decommissioning 
Allioth returned to Pearl Harbor on 15 April, and was placed out of commission there on 18 May 1946. She was transferred to MARCOM on 13 May 1947, and laid up in the National Defense Reserve Fleet at Suisun Bay, California. Her name was struck from the Navy List on 22 May 1947. Under MARCOM, the ship resumed her first name, James Rowan. On 13 October 1964, she was sold to Union Minerals and Alloys Corporation, for $50,719.

Awards
Allioths crew was eligible for the following medals:
 Combat Action Ribbon (retroactive, 14 November 1944)
 American Campaign Medal
 Asiatic-Pacific Campaign Medal
 World War II Victory Medal
 Navy Occupation Service Medal (with Asia clasp)
 Philippines Liberation Medal

Notes 

Citations

Bibliography 

Online resources

External links

Crater-class cargo ships
World War II auxiliary ships of the United States
Ships built in Richmond, California
1943 ships
Suisun Bay Reserve Fleet